Pietro Antonio Magatti (20 June 1691 – 26 September 1767) was an Italian painter, active in Lombardy in a late-Baroque (barocchetto) style. Born in Varese, known for paintings and frescoes in his hometown, Milan, Pavia, Como, as well as in the Castello di Masnago. He trained with Giovanni Gioseffo dal Sole.

External links
Santa Margaret triumphs over evil
Exhibition
Exhibition

1691 births
1767 deaths
People from Varese
17th-century Italian painters
Italian male painters
18th-century Italian painters
Italian Baroque painters
Painters from Milan
18th-century Italian male artists